Peter George "Pete" Bakovic (born January 31, 1965 in Thunder Bay, Ontario) is a retired professional ice hockey left wing who played briefly in the National Hockey League in the late 1980s for the Vancouver Canucks.

Playing career
Bakovic played his junior hockey for the Windsor Spitfires of the Ontario Hockey League but was never drafted. After a strong final year of junior, he was signed as a free agent by the Calgary Flames in 1985. A tough player who fought often, Bakovic spent three seasons playing minor pro in the Flames' system without seeing an NHL game. In two years with the Moncton Golden Flames of the AHL, he led the team in penalty minutes both years, but also posted respectable offensive totals, notching 54 and 51 points. In his only year with the Salt Lake Golden Eagles, Bakovic posted 43 points in 39 games along with 221 PIM.

Late in the 1987–88 season, he was dealt to the Vancouver Canucks. Vancouver immediately promoted him to their NHL team, and he played 10 games for the Canucks, recording 2 goals and 48 PIM. However, injuries struck the next year and he found himself back in the IHL with the Milwaukee Admirals. Bakovic would play three more seasons in Milwaukee without seeing another NHL game before retiring in 1991.

Post-playing career
Following his retirement, Bakovic stayed in Milwaukee and remained with the Admirals organization as an assistant coach until 1998. He continues to reside in Milwaukee with wife and two daughters  and coaches high school hockey.

Career statistics

Regular season and playoffs

External links

1965 births
Canadian expatriate ice hockey players in the United States
Canadian ice hockey left wingers
Ice hockey people from Ontario
Kitchener Rangers players
Living people
Milwaukee Admirals (IHL) players
Moncton Golden Flames players
Salt Lake Golden Eagles (IHL) players
Sportspeople from Thunder Bay
Undrafted National Hockey League players
Vancouver Canucks players
Windsor Spitfires players